The Yingya Shenglan, written by Ma Huan in 1451, is a book about the countries visited by him over the course of the Ming treasure voyages led by Zheng He.

There is no surviving extant version of the original Yingya Shenglan. However, later Ming copies of Ma's work have been preserved, even though these copies contain differences due to later editors. These include the Yihai Huihan [藝海匯函] version (1507), Zhang Sheng's so-called "rifacimento" (1522),  the Guochao Diangu [國朝典故] version (edited by Deng Shilong), the Jilu Huibian [紀錄彙編] version (1617) and the Shengchao Yishi [勝朝遺事] version (1824) from the Qing period. 

Ma Huan served as an interpreter on the fourth, sixth, and seventh voyage. Guo Chongli was Ma Huan collaborator on the Yingya Shenglan. He personally participated in three of the expeditions. These two gentlemen recorded their observations in notes, which were used to compose the Yingya Shenglan.

See also 
 Fei Xin's Xingcha Shenglan
 Gong Zhen's Xiyang Fanguo Zhi

Notes

References

Citations

Sources 

 
 
 
 
 
 
 

Chinese history texts
15th-century history books
Travel books
Ming dynasty literature
Treasure voyages
Chinese non-fiction books